Tofik Ismailov (June 21, 1933 – November 20, 1991) was born in Baku, Azerbaijan and served as the first Secretary of State of Azerbaijan.

He was killed in a helicopter which was shot down by Armenian forces near the Karakend village of Khojavend district in Nagorno-Karabakh, Azerbaijan. There were no survivors of the crash.

Ismayilov's official burial was done at the Avenue of the Honored Ones Cemetery in Baku. A stadium in Baku, many schools and streets were named after him.

See also
1991 Azerbaijani Mil Mi-8 shootdown
Tofig Ismayilov Stadium

References

Politicians from Baku
1933 births
1991 deaths
Political office-holders in Azerbaijan
Victims of aircraft shootdowns